Kaun Rokega Mujhe ( Who will stop me?) is a 1997 Hindi-language action thriller film of Bollywood, directed and produced by Kamal Raj Bhasin and starring Chunky Pandey and Nagma in the lead roles. This film was released on 12 December 1997 under the banner of Kamal Raj International. The music directors of the film were Laxmikant–Pyarelal.

Plot
Mohan falls in love with Sudha, and they decide to marry. But local powerful Thakur Ranjit Singh makes a false murder case against Mohan and sends him into  jail. Sudha's brother Bhola believes that Mohan is innocent and goes to find the real culprit. Bhola meets a lady named Nisha. Both search for a witness of Mohan's innocence, but fail each and every time because someone behind the scenes is killing those witnesses one by one. Finally, they get the help of one police inspector Iqbal.

Cast
 Chunky Pandey as Bhola
 Nagma as Nisha
 Prem Chopra as Thakur Ranjit Singh
 Sudha Chandran as Sudha
 Govinda as Inspector Iqbal
 Beena Banerjee as Debi
 Kunika as Radha
 Ranjeet as Narayan Das
 Shashi Puri as Mohan
 Pran
 Sadashiv Amrapurkar
 Gulshan Grover
 Shakti Kapoor
 Asrani
 Kiran Kumar
 Yunus Parvez
 Narendra Bedi
 Rajendra Nath

Soundtrack
"Badhaai Ho Badhaai" - Mohammed Aziz, Shailendra Singh
"Chhora Badnam Hua" - Sudesh Bhosale
"Dushmanon Ki Badi Meharban" - Shailendra Singh, Kavita Krishnamurthy
"Haath Mera Pakadne Se Pahle" - Kavita Krishnamurthy
"Hatah Mera Pakadne Se Pahle v2" - Kavita Krishnamurthy
"Suit Mera Americawala" - Sudesh Bhosale, Alka Yagnik
"Zindagi Hai Nasha" - Neisha

References

External links
 

1997 films
Indian action thriller films
1990s Hindi-language films
1997 crime thriller films
Indian crime thriller films
1997 action thriller films
1990s thriller drama films
Indian thriller drama films
Films scored by Laxmikant–Pyarelal
1997 drama films